Candente Copper is developing its flagship project Cañariaco, within which Cañariaco Norte, is the 10th largest late-stage copper resource in the world (over 9B pounds copper, 2.1M ounces of gold and 59.4M ounces of silver Measured and Indicated*) and 6th highest in grade (RFC Ambrian, December 2021 and Haywood, December 2021).  A positive PEA was recently completed on its 100% owned Cañariaco project.  
Based on projected average annual metal production of 173M pounds copper, 31,395 ounces gold and 703,588 ounces silver for 28 years and an initial capital cost estimate of $1.04B, the Cañariaco Norte project has an after-tax net present value (“NPV”) of US$1,010M using a copper price of US$3.50/pound and a discount rate of 8%. The NPV increases to US$1,833M and payback of 4.5 years when using a copper price of US$4.50/pound.

In addition to Cañariaco Norte, the Cañariaco Project includes the Cañariaco Sur deposit (2.2B pounds copper, 1.2M ounces of gold and 15.0M ounces of silver Inferred*) and Quebrada Verde prospect, all within a 4km NE-SW trend in northern Peru’s prolific mining district.

The Company is very pleased to now have Cañariaco Norte included in 4 research reports that compare global copper projects.  RFC Ambrian: Cañariaco Norte in top 10 of 23 projects with potential to involve third party M&A (December 2021); Haywood: Cañariaco Norte one of 18 assets selected as likely to be considered by majors looking to acquire (December 2021); Deutsche Bank: Cañariaco Norte identified as one of 3 projects required to meet the upcoming copper supply-demand gap (February 2021); Goldman Sachs: Cañariaco Norte identified with incentive copper price in the lowest quartile of the top 84 copper projects worldwide (October 2018).

References

Mining companies of Canada
Mining in Peru
Mining in Mexico
Companies based in Vancouver
Companies listed on the Toronto Stock Exchange